The  men's 1500 metres at the 2009 World Championships in Athletics was held at the Olympic Stadium between 15–19 August. Among the favoured athletes in the event were defending champion Bernard Lagat, European champion Mehdi Baala, and the Kenyan season leaders Asbel Kiprop, Haron Keitany and Augustine Choge.

All the favoured athletes progressed through a series of tactically-run heats on the first day of competition, with Baala, Kiprop, Choge and Deresse Mekonnen the four race winners. Moroccan Amine Laalou won the first semi-final, followed by Americans Lopez Lomong and Lagat, while Kiprop and Leonel Manzano both finished quickly to take the top two qualifying spots in the second race. The only high-profile athlete to be eliminated in the semi-finals was Keitany, who did not start, putting an end to any hopes of a Kenyan medal sweep.

The final race began slowly and, as the athletes reached the last lap, they remained in a tight pack led by Mekonnen. Choge and Mohamed Moustaoui closely followed as he approached the final straight, but the race remained open. Yusuf Saad Kamel took the lead in the final straight, scoring a surprise gold medal. Mekonnen maintained his pace to take the silver medal and defending champion Lagat had a quick burst near the finish to win the bronze. Kiprop, one of the pre-race favourites, left himself too much ground to cover, eventually ending up fourth, with Choge and Baala alongside him.

Bahrain's Kamel, born in Kenya as Gregory Konchellah, followed in the footsteps of his father Billy Konchellah, who won the 800 m at the 1987 and 1991 World Championships. Mekonnen's silver was Ethiopia's first ever World Championship medal in the 1500 m. Lagat's bronze was his third in the 1500 m, after his silver in 2001 and a gold in 2007.

Medalists

Records

Qualification standards

Schedule

Results

Heats
Qualification: First 5 in each heat(Q) and the next 4 fastest(q) advance to the semifinal.

Key:  PB = Personal best, Q = qualification by place in heat, q = qualification by overall place, SB = Seasonal best

Semifinals
Qualification: First 5 in each semifinal(Q) and the next 2 fastest(q) advance to the final.

Final

References
General
1500 metres results from IAAF. IAAF. Archived 2013-12-12.  Retrieved on 2018-07-25.
Specific

1500 metres
1500 metres at the World Athletics Championships